Elachiptera nigriceps is a species of frit fly in the family Chloropidae.

References

Oscinellinae
Articles created by Qbugbot
Taxa named by Hermann Loew
Insects described in 1863